Keerthi Gopinath is an Indian actress who acts mainly in Malayalam movies and television serials. She made a comeback after 20 years through Ammayariyathe telecasting in Asianet. She acted as heroine in the comedy movie Junior Mandrake released in 1997. Her role as Vava in Asianet serial Niramala was also well noted.

Personal life
She wasborn to Gopinath and Geetha at Lakkattoor, Kottayam, Kerala. Her father was an air force officer and her mother a housewife. Since her father was in the air force. and had transfers every three years, she studied in different parts of India. She gained her primary education in Bangalore.

She is married to Rahul, who is also an actor in Malayalam and Tamil serials. The couple has two sons, Bharath and Aryan.

Filmography

Television

TV show
Chitrageetham (Doordarshan) as Host
Red Carpet (Amrita TV) as Mentor

Television Serials
Neelavasantham (Doordarshan)
Neela Viriyitta Jalakam (Doordarshan)
Eka Tharakam (Doordarshan)
Chamayam (Doordarshan)
Niramala (Asianet)
Ammayariyathe (Asianet)

References

External links

 https://en.msidb.org/displayProfile.php?category=actors&artist=Keerthi%20Gopinath

Actresses in Malayalam cinema
Indian film actresses
Year of birth missing (living people)
Living people
Actresses from Kerala
Place of birth missing (living people)
20th-century Indian actresses
21st-century Indian actresses
Indian child actresses
Actresses in Malayalam television